Seaslug was a first-generation surface-to-air missile designed by Armstrong Whitworth (later part of the Hawker Siddeley group) for use by the Royal Navy. Tracing its history as far back as 1943's LOPGAP design, it came into operational service in 1961 and was still in use at the time of the Falklands War in 1982.

Seaslug was intended to engage high-flying targets such as reconnaissance aircraft or bombers before they could launch stand-off weapons. It was only fitted to the Royal Navy's eight County-class destroyers which were designed around the missile system. Seaslug was only fired in anger once as an anti-aircraft missile, from  during the Falklands War, but missed its target. Later improvements meant that it could also be used against ships and ground targets.

It was planned that Seaslug's medium-range role was to be supplanted by a very long-range missile known as Blue Envoy, but this was passed over in favour of a new medium-range system, Sea Dart. Sea Dart entered service in 1973 on the Type 82 destroyers and replaced Seaslug during the 1980s as the s were removed from service.

Development

Initial concept
In 1943, the German Luftwaffe began the use of anti-shipping missiles and guided bombs in the Mediterranean Sea during Allied operations against Italy. These weapons were released outside of anti-aircraft gun range, which meant that naval operations lacking complete air superiority would be open to attack with no effective response from the ships. A solution for long-range anti-aircraft was required. On 16 March 1944 the first meeting of the "Guided Anti-Aircraft Projectile Committee", or GAP Committee, was held.

The Admiralty Signals Establishment (ASE), in charge of the Navy's radar development, was working on new radars featuring radar lock-on that allowed them to accurately track aircraft at long range. This was part of the LRS.1 fire-control system that allowed large dual-purpose guns to attack bombers at long range. A contemporary British Army project at Cossors, Brakemine, was working on a system to allow a missile to keep itself centred within a radar beam, a concept known today as beam riding. The Navy decided to combine the two concepts, using the LRS.1's Type 909 radar with a new missile that differed from Brakemine primarily in requiring longer range and being more robust for shipborne use.

This project was briefly known as LOPGAP, short for "Liquid Oxygen and Petrol Guided Anti-aircraft Projectile", but soon moved from petrol to methanol which made the "LOP" inaccurate.

LOPGAP
The Fairey Aviation Company was at this time working on a missile project for the Ministry of Supply, Stooge. Stooge was more like an armed drone aircraft than a missile. It was flown to a location in front of the target and then cruised toward it until its warhead was triggered by the operator. It was designed primarily to defeat kamikaze attacks at short range. Its low speed and manual guidance meant it was not useful for interceptions outside the immediate area of the ship, and thus did not meet the need for a longer-ranged missile capable of dealing with stand-off weapons.

Accordingly, Fairey was ordered to stop work on Stooge in favour of LOPGAP. Development was slowed by the Air Ministry who were opposed to the project as it might take resources away from jet fighter production and a lack of urgency on the part of both the Admiralty and Ministry of Supply.

A March 1945 report called for the first test launches of LOPGAP from converted QF 3.7-inch air-aircraft gun mounts within two months. The same mounts had also been used, with other modifications, for Stooge and Brakemine.

Move to RAE
In 1945 a new Guided Projectiles Establishment was set up under the Controller of Supplies (Air) and in 1946 development of all ongoing missile projects moved to the Royal Aircraft Establishment's (RAE) new Controlled Weapons Department, soon to become the Guided Weapons Department. They began considering the beam riding concept in partnership with the Telecommunications Research Establishment (TRE), the deliberately oddly-named department of the Air Ministry responsible for radar development. Over the next year, first Brakemine and then Stooge were moved to the RAE.

In a January 1947 Navy review, the program was given the name Seaslug. Development continued as before but was significantly hampered by the post-war exodus of engineering talent. Shortly after the new definition was produced, this project also moved to the RAE. Efforts by the Navy to change the name from Seaslug to the more ominous-sounding "Triumph" failed.

Development slowed, and in July 1947 the Admiralty approached Henry Tizard to argue for a more "virile leadership" of the program. Tizard called a meeting of the Defence Research Policy Committee (DRPC) and started a process of pushing through four key missile programs that were intended to enter service in 1957, Seaslug, a corresponding Army/Air Force missile known as Red Heathen, the Blue Boar television guided glide bomb, and the Red Hawk air-to-air missile.

In March 1948 a new report from the DRPC noted there was not enough manpower for all four projects, and put Seaslug at the bottom of the priority list, claiming air attack would be less likely than submarine in the event of war. They suggested the much longer ranged Red Heathen was more important in the short term. The Admiralty was of another opinion on the matter and argued against the change in priority.

The Navy found an unlikely ally in the Army, who were concerned that Red Heathen was too difficult to move to in a single stage and suggested that Seaslug might be the basis for a more immediate medium-range weapon that could be used both on land and sea. The DPRC also began to have concerns about guiding Red Heathen at its  maximum range. In September 1948 they agreed to develop Seaslug "as a matter of insurance", before further upgrading it in 1949 to "top priority".

Experimental systems
Two test systems emerged from this centralization. The CTV.1 was a small unpowered Brakemine-like system devoted to the development of the guidance systems, launched using three RP-3 rocket motors and controlled through the coast phase. A series of CTV designs followed, providing ever-increasing amounts of telemetry for the guidance and control systems work. GAP became a purely research-oriented system, RTV.1 (rocket test vehicle), as opposed to a prototype missile design, and was used primarily as a platform for testing the rocket motors. The GAP/RTV.1 efforts would be directed at the Stage 1 design, which would essentially be the Seaslug requirement.

The relatively small CTV could safely be launched at the Larkhill Range, part of the Royal School of Artillery. It was equipped with a parachute that allowed it to be recovered. This was not possible for the much longer-ranged RTV, which was fired from RAF Aberporth out over Cardigan Bay in Wales. The desire to reclaim the RTVs as well led to the opening of a parallel launch facility at the RAAF Woomera Range Complex and a program that led development of supersonic parachutes.

As RTV testing continued, the decision was made to build a larger version, RTV.2, which would be more typical of a production missile. During early testing, the design was further modified and renamed GPV, for General Purpose Test Vehicle. Several liquid rocket motors were tested as part of this program. Early tests demonstrated shifts in the center of gravity that required active damping, which in turn led to the lengthening of the overall fuselage to become the "long round". This version used forward-mounted boosters, which were mounted so their exhaust was just in front of the mid-mounted wings.

Project 502
As experimental work progressed, the Ministry of Supply began forming an industry team to build production systems. In 1949 this gave rise to the 'Project 502' group from industry, with Armstrong Whitworth Aircraft and Sperry in March and GEC in September.

Maximum altitude should be 55,000 ft, but 45,000 would be considered acceptable. It was assumed the targets would "jink" at 1G, so the missile needed to maneuver at 4G at sea level and 2.5G at 40,000 ft. Additional requirements were the ability to switch between targets in 6 seconds.

The designers ultimately selected a maximum range of 30,000 yards, which included  of coasting after motor burn-out. This was about 50% better than the contemporary US Terrier design. Hit probability was estimated to be 40% at maximum range, so salvos of three missiles would be fired at once, demanding a three-place launcher. This was later reduced back to a twin-launcher when it was realized accessing the missile in the middle launcher would make maintenance difficult.

Changing requirements
When the deployment of the Seaslug was first being considered, three classes of custom missile-firing ships were considered. The Ocean Convoy Escort was a  vessel that would provide direct cover over seagoing convoys, while the  Coastal Convoy Escort would do the same closer to shore. At that time it was believed that aircraft carriers would be able to provide adequate cover over convoys or fleets in the ocean, so attention turned to the Coastal Convoy Escort. Beginning in May 1953 a Beachy Head-class repair ship was converted into a prototype escort ship, to test this fitting.

For this role, the densest possible storage was required, so the initial design of a single booster rocket at the base end of the missile. The boosters were positioned so they lay within the diameter defined by the missile's wings, so they did not make it any larger in diameter when stored. If one of the boosters did not fire the thrust would be significantly off-axis, a possibility which was later addressed by moving the boosters forward so their exhaust was near the centre of gravity of the missile, allowing the missile's small control surfaces to remain effective.

In 1954, during another review of the Navy's future operations, consideration turned from a "hot war" against the Soviets to a series of "warm wars" in the third world. Among other changes brought about by this review, including the cancellation of a future all-gun cruiser class and ending further conversion of WWII-era destroyers to Type 15 frigates, the new environment meant that air cover by carriers could not be guaranteed, and the need for air defence for task-force sized groups became the primary concern. A cut to carrier construction, capping the fleet at four, released funds for missile ship construction. In October 1954, a new design emerged that demanded the speed to keep up with a fleet in combat, have guns limited to self-defence, and carrying a single twin-missile launcher.

The designs were continually modified in order to find a suitable arrangement. They started as early as 1953 with a mid-sized cruiser of  carrying 60 to 90 missiles and a crew of 900. Admiral Ralph Edwards pointed out it would be more useful to have a larger number of small ships with 10 to 20 missiles than one larger one, but attempts to design such a ship resulted in one with room for the weapons but not the crew needed to operate them. In May 1955 a wide variety of plans for designs between the two extremes were compared, ranging from 9,850 tons down to 4,550. After continual comparison and revision, these plans finally gelled around what became the County-class destroyer.

Testing

Test firings of the GAP-based examples, now known as Rocket Test Vehicle 1, or RTV.1, demonstrated beam riding in October 1956. The Navy had set a date of 1957 for a broad modernization of the fleet, so they desired Seaslug to be cleared for service in 1956. To this end, they accepted the use of liquid fuels in spite of the Navy's concerns with these fuels on ships. However, by 1956 a new solid fuel rocket had been developed at the Summerfield Research Station which provided the desired range.

Continual tests took place over the next four years using both the Clausen Rolling Platform at RAE Aberporth and the Girdle Ness. A final series of tests at sea, which culminated in sixteen successful firings, finally cleared the missile for service in 1961. After more than 250 launches, the Seaslug Mark 1, also known as Guided Weapon System 1, or GWS.1, finally entered service in 1962 on County-class, each fitted with a single twin missile launcher and a complete weapon system with one fire control set and 30 missiles. The Seaslug-armed cruisers were cancelled in 1957.

Seaslug needed height, range and bearing information for targets. By 1955 the Royal Navy considered using the Type 984 radar on Seaslug-armed cruisers and destroyers to provide this. During development, the projected weight of the radar doubled, to the point where it could still potentially be mounted on cruisers, but was rejected for destroyers because it would have meant sacrificing their 4.5 in gun armament. The gun armament was regarded as essential for the navy's wider role outside the hot war mission. The solution adopted with the first batch of the County-class destroyers was to network them with ships carrying Type 984. The destroyers were given a reduced version of the Comprehensive Display System (CDS), which was fed by a CDS-link receiver called DPD (Digital Picture Transmission or Translation).

The final set for the County ships, actually more a cruiser type than a destroyer, was quite complex: a Type 965 radar for early warning (P-band, 450 kW peak power, range over 175 km), in the County Batch 2 the double antenna AKE-2 had two different frequency settings; a Type 992Q target indicator radar (3 GHz, 1.75 MW peak power, 90 km range); a Type 278 height finding set (80–90 km); a Type 901 missile guidance radar (X band, 70 km range), that in the Sea Slug Mk 2 had a continuous wave signal (but it was still a beam riding designation radar); a Type 904 fire control radar (used in the MRS-3 system, X-band, 50 kW, 35 km range) for surface targeting.

Description
The missile had four wrap-around booster motors that separated after launch. After separation, the main motor ignited to power the missile to the target. The booster motors were positioned at the side of the missile, but this unusual arrangement with the motor nozzles both angled outwards at 22.5° and 22.5° to the left, the missile entered a gentle roll at launch, evening out differences in the thrusts of the boosters. This meant that large stabilising fins as used on contemporary missiles in service with the Royal Air Force (Bloodhound) and the British Army (Thunderbird) were not required. Once the boosters were jettisoned the control surfaces became active.

Guidance was by radar beam-riding, the beam to be provided by Type 901 fire-control radar. There were four flight modes:

 LOSBR (Line Of Sight, Beam Riding), in which the missile flew up a beam that tracked the target
 CASWTD (Constant Angle of Sight With Terminal Dive), with the missile climbing at a low angle and then diving onto a low-altitude target at 45°, used against low flying targets at over 12,000 yards away
 MICAWBER (Missile In Constant Altitude While BEam Riding), used against low level target approaching at 500–800 feet, it allows switching from CASWTD to LOSBR when the target is closing at the ship
 Up and over: the standard surface attack mode, using the Type 901 radar slaved to the Type 903 in bearing; the missile is fired at high elevation and then depressed in order to strike the vessel with a steep dive, without arming the fuse.

Electrical power when the missile was in flight was provided by a flux switching alternator with a six tooth rotor. "The 1.5 kVA Seaslug generator ran at 24,000 rev/min with a frequency of 2,400 Hz."

Service performance

Seaslug was a high-performance weapon in the 1960s, with a single-shot kill probability of 92%, although other sources give lower kill probabilities: 75% for the Mk 1 and 65% for the Mk 2. The first four ships of the County-class (Batch 1) operated the Seaslug Mk 1, while the final four (Batch 2) were fitted with the ADAWS command and control system which enabled them to carry the more capable Mk 2 version. A proposal to refit the Batch 1 ships with ADAWS was dropped in 1968.

On 21 May 1982 in Falkland Sound, the Antrim which had already had an unexploded 1,000 lb bomb pass through the Seaslug magazine, fired a single missile (some sources say two) at one of a second wave of attacking IAI Dagger fighters. It was unguided because the aircraft was too low to be acquired; the launch was intended to deter the pilot and to remove the exposed missile from the ship because it posed a fire hazard. The first combat use in the surface-to-surface role was during a shore bombardment on 26 May, when  fired Seaslugs at Port Stanley Airport claiming the destruction of a number of helicopters and a radar installation. A total of eight Seaslug Mk 2 missiles were launched in theatre by the two ships armed with them, including two missiles jettisoned by Glamorgan after she was hit by a land-launched Exocet missile on 12 June. Also during 1982, the Mk2 was used as a trials target for Seadart, but there were reliability problems with both systems. 

Fife and the remaining GWS2 ships were sold to Chile between 1982 and 1987. Initially, the British government had hoped that the Chileans would accept a package to upgrade the ships to operate Seadart, but this was not taken up and they were transferred complete with Seaslug. The Chilean ships were later refitted with an extended flight deck in place of the Seaslug launcher.

Variants

There were two main variants of the Seaslug:

Mark 1 (GWS.1)
The Seaslug Mark 1 was powered by the solid-fuel Foxhound (390 kg fuel) sustainer motor and Gosling(145 kg) booster motors. It had a radio proximity fuze and  blast warhead.

The Mark 1 was a beam rider missile, meaning the target had to be continually illuminated by the directing radar, so the system was limited to engaging only the number of targets that there were radars to track and lock on.

 Attack Velocity: 
 Range: 
 Ceiling:

Mark 2 (GWS.2)
The Seaslug Mark 2 was based on the aborted Blue Slug programme to develop an anti-ship missile using the Seaslug missile and guidance system. The project was cancelled in favour of the "Green Cheese" missile, a tactical nuclear anti-ship weapon, but other project developments were incorporated into what became the Mark 2. It had improved low altitude performance and a limited anti-ship capability and entered service in 1971. The Mark 2 utilized an improved beam-riding guidance system. and solid-state electronics. It was powered by the Deerhound sustainer motor, with Retriever boosters. Control was by a modified Type 901M radar and it had an improved infra-red proximity fuze and a continuous-rod warhead with a smaller, explosive charge (RDX-TNT) and an unfold diameter of about 70 feet (10 mm steel rods were used) 

 Attack velocity: 
 Range: 
 Ceiling: 

The capabilities of the new Sea Slug Mk 2, an almost 2.5 ton missile, were much improved compared to the previous Mk 1. The boosters gave a total of about 60 tons-force, with  fuel for each one (145 kg in the Mk 1), accelerating it to over Mach 2. The slender missile remained at over Mach 2-2.5 until the flameout.

The range could be even more than 35,000 yards, especially at high altitude, with head-on supersonic targets. The missile was capable to reach potentially aven higher altitude and longer range than nominally assested: even after the engine flameout (over 40 seconds after launch), it retained very high speeds, and one of them even surpassed  before being self-destructed, about one minute after the firing 

For both Mark 1 and Mark 2 Sea Slug there were drill rounds (painted blue) for the purpose of training and display rounds (painted red) which could be loaded onto the launcher for port visits and public relations.

Nuclear variant (not built)
In addition, a nuclear-armed variant was planned using a low-yield fission warhead code-named Winkle. Winkle was never built as it was quickly supplanted by Pixie, a very small unboosted warhead with an all-plutonium fissile core tested at Maralinga, which was, in turn, replaced by Gwen — a British version of the US W54 Gnat unboosted warhead of approximate yield 0.5–2 kiloton of TNT-equivalent. The final warhead choice was Tony - a UK version of the W44 Tsetse boosted warhead, but all nuclear options for Seaslug were subsequently abandoned, and no nuclear-armed variant of Seaslug was ever deployed.

Operators

Royal Navy
The County-class destroyers were specifically built to carry Seaslug and its associated control equipment. The magazine was positioned amidships and missiles were assembled in a central gallery forward of the magazine before being passed to the launcher on the quarterdeck. The handling arrangements were designed with a nuclear-war environment in mind and were therefore entirely under cover.

Chilean Navy
Some of the County-class destroyers were sold to Chile for the Chilean Navy. The system was decommissioned after the rebuild of the four ships purchased by Chile in the early 1990s.

Former operators
 : Chilean Navy
 : Royal Navy

Notes

References

Bibliography

Bibliography
 Naval Armament, Doug Richardson, Jane's Publishing, 1981,

External links 

 Sea Slug Video
"Seaslug - the Most Missile in the Least Space" a 1958 Flight article by Bill Gunston
"Shell for the Seaslug" a 1959 article on Seaslug in Flight magazine
"Seaslug Story" a 1962 Flight article on the Seaslug
 United Kingdom Aerospace and Weapon Projects
 The Falkland Islands Conflict, 1982: Air Defense Of The Fleet
Winkle - warhead for the planned nuclear variant

Naval weapons of the United Kingdom
Naval surface-to-air missiles
Surface-to-air missiles of the United Kingdom
Military equipment introduced in the 1960s